Atuma was a Sultan of Kano who reigned for only 7 days in 1452.

Biography in the Kano Chronicle
Below is a biography of Atuma from Palmer's 1908 English translation of the Kano Chronicle.

References

Monarchs of Kano